Love or Money is a 2021 Philippine romantic comedy film starring Coco Martin and Angelica Panganiban, directed by Mae Cruz-Alviar, produced by Star Cinema. The film was released on March 12, 2021 on KTX, iWantTFC, TFC IPTV PPV and on Sky Cable PPV. It was supposed to be available on Cignal PPV, but was discontinued due to the extension availability of Hello Stranger: The Movie. This film is currently available on Netflix since May 15, 2021.

The film was supposed to be released on April 11, 2020 (Black Saturday) as an entry to the supposed  2020 Metro Manila Summer Film Festival, however the event was cancelled due to the COVID-19 pandemic in the Philippines.

Cast
 Coco Martin as Leon Antonio
 Angelica Panganiban as Angel Dela Cerna
 Gelli de Bellen as Tita Faye
 Ketchup Eusebio as Juniver
 Cai Cortez as Cat
 Matet de Leon as Mima
 Dante Rivero as Tatay Perts
 Teresa Loyzaga as Tita Annette
 Pinky Amador as Tita Lorena
 Jeremiah Lisbo as Patrick
 Hanz Correa as Jhim
 Ria Atayde as Agnes
 RK Bagatsing as Angel's Ex Boyfriend

References

External links
 

Films not released in theaters due to the COVID-19 pandemic
Films postponed due to the COVID-19 pandemic
Films directed by Mae Cruz-Alviar